The Heights or Heights may refer to:

 height

Places 

Brooklyn Heights, a historic neighborhood of Brooklyn, New York, west and south of the Brooklyn Bridge, known locally as "The Heights"
Cambrian Heights, a neighbourhood in Calgary, Alberta
Glendale Heights, a suburb west of Chicago, Illinois
The Heights, Jersey City, New Jersey, US
Sterling Heights, Michigan, a suburb of Detroit also known as "The Heights"
Hacienda Heights, a suburban community of Los Angeles known locally as "The Heights"
Houston Heights, a historic neighborhood of Houston, Texas, known locally as "The Heights" 
Heights, Greater Manchester, a hamlet
Washington Heights, Manhattan, a neighborhood of Uptown Manhattan
El Alto, a city in Bolivia which means “The Heights”
The Heights (Middlebury, Vermont) (also known as Thaddeus Chapman House), a historic country estate in Middlebury, VT
 The Heights, the official designation of the city of Cincinnati, Ohio, for the neighborhood consisting primarily of the University of Cincinnati

Schools 

Boston College, nicknamed “The Heights”.
The Heights (newspaper), its independent student newspaper
The Heights School (disambiguation)
The Heights School (Maryland), a preparatory school for boys in Potomac, Maryland, USA
Heights School (Australia), a public high school in Adelaide
The Heights Free School (Blackburn), an alternative free school  in the United Kingdom

Entertainment 
The Heights (American TV series), a 1992 American drama television series that aired on Fox
The Heights, also the name of the band in the series
The Heights (Australian TV series), a 2019 Australian drama television series starring Marcus Graham
"The Heights" (The O.C.), a 2003 episode of the TV series The O.C.
Heights (album), a 2021 album by Walk the Moon
Heights (band), a British rock band from Hertfordshire
Heights (film), a 2005 drama starring Glenn Close
"Heights" (song), a 2009 song by Eyes Set to Kill from The World Outside

Other 
Al-A'raf, Arabic for "The Heights", the seventh chapter of the Qur'an

See also

 
 
 
 Height (disambiguation)